National Nurses United (NNU) is the largest organization of registered nurses in the United States. With more than 225,000 members, it is the farthest-reaching union and professional association of registered nurses in the U.S. Founded in 2009 through the merging of the California Nurses Association/National Nurses Organizing Committee, the United American Nurses, and the Massachusetts Nurses Association, the NNU focuses on amplifying the voice of direct care RNs and patients in national policy. The union's policy positions include the enactment of safe nurse-to-patient ratios, patient advocacy rights at the Executive and State level, and legislation for single-payer health care to secure "quality healthcare for all, as a human right." The organization's goal is to "organize all direct care RNs into a single organization capable of exercising influence over the healthcare industry, governments, and employers."

Leadership 
The Executive Director of the national organization, which is affiliated with the AFL–CIO, is labor leader Bonnie Castillo, who also heads the 90,000-member California Nurses Association. The former Executive Director is RoseAnn DeMoro, who serves as National Vice President and Executive Board Member of the AFL–CIO.

Activities

Single-payer health care 
The organization backs a Medicare for All single-payer healthcare plan for the United States.

To support a single-payer system, NNU leadership mobilized large-scale demonstrations demanding single-payer healthcare be included in the platform at the 2016 Democratic National Convention.

Occupy Wall Street 
National Nurses United has held numerous protests, including one in front of the U.S. Chamber of Commerce and another on Wall Street, to protest privatization and profiteering in the health care industry.

NNU supports a tax on financial transactions, which the organization says could raise at least $350 billion a year.

Support for Bernie Sanders 

In The New York Times on January 28, 2016, Nicholas Confessore reported, "According to Federal Election Commission records [NNU's] 'super PAC' has spent close to $1 million on ads and other support for Democratic presidential candidate Bernie Sanders. The NNU spending was classified as "Expressly advocating the election or defeat of a clearly identified candidate." In 2019, NNU officially endorsed Sanders for the 2020 Democratic presidential nomination.

History

United American Nurses

Founded in 1999, it only represented registered nurses (RNs). In 2009, UAN merged with the California Nurses Association/National Nurses Organizing Committee and Massachusetts Nurses Association to form NNU.

New York State Nurses Association
The New York State Nurses Association (NYSNA) voted to join NNU as an affiliate in October 2022, increasing NNU's total membership to nearly 225,000.

See also 

California Nurses Association

References

External links 
 
 Main Street Contract for the American People

 
Nursing organizations in the United States
2009 establishments in the United States
Trade unions established in 2009
AFL–CIO